Ken Foree (born February 29, 1948) is an American actor, best known as the protagonist Peter from the horror film Dawn of the Dead (1978) and as Roger Rockmore on the Nickelodeon television sitcom Kenan & Kel (1996–2000).

Early life and career 
Foree was born in Indianapolis, Indiana. He began acting in the 1970s, appearing in films such as The Bingo Long Traveling All-Stars & Motor Kings, The Wanderers,  Dawn of the Dead, and Leatherface: The Texas Chainsaw Massacre III. He also had roles in the films Knightriders, From Beyond, and The Dentist. In 1995, he starred in an episode of The X-Files. Foree also played Roger Rockmore, Kenan and Kyra's father on the Nickelodeon sitcom Kenan & Kel. In 2005, he played Charlie Altamont in the film The Devil's Rejects, starring opposite Sid Haig and Bill Moseley as the adopted brother of Haig's character. In 2007, he appeared in Rob Zombie's remake of the 1978 film Halloween.

Ken Foree appeared as himself in the 2008 novel Bad Moon Rising by Jonathan Maberry. Foree is one of several real-world horror celebrities who are in the fictional town of Pine Deep when monsters attack. Other celebrities include Tom Savini, Jim O'Rear, Brinke Stevens, James Gunn, Stephen Susco, Debbie Rochon, Joe Bob Briggs, and Mem Shannon.

The horror-comedy film Shaun of the Dead contains a reference to Foree, as the film's main character is an employee of Foree Electronics.

Foree Fest 
Foree has his own horror festival. Known as Foree Fest, the first event was held in the U.K. in 2007. A second took place in October 2009, and a third event was held in 2013.

Filmography

References

External links

Ken Foree's U.K Foree Fest website
Audio interview at BBC Wiltshire
Interview at Homepage of the Dead
Ken Foree in Brotherhood of Blood at FEARnet

1948 births
Living people
American male film actors
Male actors from Indianapolis
African-American male actors
American male television actors
21st-century African-American people
20th-century African-American people